Arthur St. Clair ( – August 31, 1818) was a Scottish-American soldier and politician. Born in Thurso, Scotland, he served in the British Army during the French and Indian War before settling in Pennsylvania, where he held local office. During the American Revolutionary War, he rose to the rank of major general in the Continental Army, but lost his command after a controversial retreat from Fort Ticonderoga.

After the war, he served as President of the Continental Congress, which during his term passed the Northwest Ordinance. He was then made governor of the Northwest Territory in 1788, and then the portion that would become Ohio in 1800. In 1791, St. Clair commanded the American forces in what was the United States' worst-ever defeat by the Native Americans, which became known as St. Clair's defeat. Politically out-of-step with the Jefferson administration, he was replaced as governor in 1802.

Early life and career
St. Clair was born in Thurso, Caithness, Scotland. Little is known of his early life. Early biographers estimated his year of birth as 1734, but subsequent historians uncovered a birth date of March 23, 1736, which in the modern calendar system means that he was born in 1737. His parents, unknown to early biographers, were probably William Sinclair, a merchant, and Elizabeth Balfour. He reportedly attended the University of Edinburgh before being apprenticed to the renowned physician William Hunter.

In 1757, St. Clair purchased a commission in the British Army, Royal American Regiment, and came to America with Admiral Edward Boscawen's fleet for the French and Indian War. He served under General Jeffery Amherst at the capture of Louisburg, Nova Scotia, on July 26, 1758. On April 17, 1759, he received a lieutenant's commission and was assigned under the command of General James Wolfe, under whom he served at the Battle of the Plains of Abraham which resulted in the capture of Quebec City.

Settler in America
On April 16, 1762, he resigned his commission, and, in 1764, he settled in Ligonier Valley, Pennsylvania, where he purchased land and erected mills. He was the largest landowner in Western Pennsylvania.

In 1770, St. Clair became a justice of the court, of quarter sessions and of common pleas, a member of the proprietary council, a justice, recorder, and clerk of the orphans' court, and prothonotary of Bedford and Westmoreland counties.

In 1774, the colony of Virginia took claim of the area around Pittsburgh, Pennsylvania, and some residents of Western Pennsylvania took up arms to eject them. St. Clair issued an order for the arrest of the officer leading the Virginia troops. Lord Dunmore's War eventually settled the boundary dispute.

Revolutionary War
By the mid-1770s, St. Clair considered himself more of an American than a British subject. In January 1776, he accepted a commission in the Continental Army as a colonel of the 3rd Pennsylvania Regiment. He first saw service in the later days of the Quebec invasion, where he saw action in the Battle of Trois-Rivières. He was appointed a brigadier general in August 1776, and was sent by Gen. George Washington to help organize the New Jersey militia. He took part in George Washington's crossing of the Delaware River on the night of December 25–26, 1776, before the Battle of Trenton on the morning of December 26. Many biographers credit St. Clair with the strategy that led to Washington's capture of Princeton, New Jersey, on January 3, 1777. St. Clair was promoted to major general in February 1777.

In April 1777, St. Clair was sent to defend Fort Ticonderoga. His outnumbered garrison could not resist British General John Burgoyne's larger force in the Saratoga campaign. St. Clair was forced to retreat at the Siege of Fort Ticonderoga on July 5, 1777. He withdrew his forces and played no further part in the campaign. In 1778 he was court-martialed for the loss of Ticonderoga. The court exonerated him and he returned to duty, although he was no longer given any battlefield commands. He still saw action, however, as an aide-de-camp to General Washington, who retained a high opinion of him. St. Clair was at Yorktown when Lord Cornwallis surrendered his army. During his military service, St. Clair was elected a member of the American Philosophical Society in 1780.

President of the United States in Congress Assembled
St. Clair was a member of the Pennsylvania Council of Censors in 1783 and was elected a delegate to the Confederation Congress, serving from November 2, 1785, until November 28, 1787. Chaos ruled the day in early 1787 with Shays's Rebellion in full force and the states refusing to settle land disputes or contribute to the now six-year-old federal government. On February 2, 1787, the delegates finally gathered into a quorum and elected St. Clair to a one-year term as President of the Continental Congress. Congress enacted its most important piece of legislation, the Northwest Ordinance, during St. Clair's tenure as president. Time was running out for the Confederation Congress, however; during St. Clair's presidency, the Philadelphia Convention was drafting a new United States Constitution, which would abolish the old Congress.

Northwest Territory

Under the Northwest Ordinance of 1787, which created the Northwest Territory, General St. Clair was appointed governor of what is now Ohio, Indiana, Illinois, Michigan, along with parts of Wisconsin and Minnesota. He named Cincinnati, Ohio, after the Society of the Cincinnati, and it was there that he established his home.

As Governor, he formulated Maxwell's Code (named after its printer, William Maxwell), the first written laws of the territory. He also sought to end Native American claims to Ohio land and clear the way for white settlement. In 1789, he succeeded in getting certain Native Americans to sign the Treaty of Fort Harmar, but many native leaders had not been invited to participate in the negotiations, or had refused to do so. Rather than settling the Native Americans' claims, the treaty provoked them to further resistance in what is also sometimes known as the "Northwest Indian War" (or "Little Turtle's War"). Mutual hostilities led to a campaign by General Josiah Harmar, whose 1,500 militiamen were defeated by the Native Americans in October 1790.

In March 1791, St. Clair succeeded Harmar as commander of the United States Army and was commissioned as a major general. He personally led a punitive expedition involving two Regular Army regiments and some militia. In October 1791 as an advance post for his campaign, Fort Jefferson (Ohio) was built under the direction of General Arthur St. Clair. Located in present-day Darke County in far western Ohio, the fort was built of wood and intended primarily as a supply depot; accordingly, it was originally named Fort Deposit.

One month later, near modern-day Fort Recovery, his force advanced to the location of Native American settlements near the headwaters of the Wabash River, but on November 4 they were routed in battle by a tribal confederation led by Miami Chief Little Turtle and Shawnee chief Blue Jacket. They were aided by British collaborators Alexander McKee and Simon Girty. More than 600 soldiers and scores of women and children were killed in the battle, which has since borne the name "St. Clair's Defeat", also known as the "Battle of the Wabash", the "Columbia Massacre," or the "Battle of a Thousand Slain". It remains the greatest defeat of a US Army by Native Americans in history, with about 623 American soldiers killed in action and about 50 Native Americans killed. The wounded were many, including St. Clair and Capt. Robert Benham.

Although an investigation exonerated him, St. Clair resigned his army commission in March 1792 at the request of President Washington, but he continued to serve as Governor of the Northwest Territory.

A Federalist, St. Clair hoped to see two states made of the Ohio Territory in order to increase Federalist power in Congress. However, he was opposed by Ohio Democratic-Republicans for what were perceived as his partisanship, high-handedness, and arrogance in office. In 1802, St. Clair remarked the U.S. Congress had no power to interfere in the affairs of those in the Ohio Territory. He also stated the people of the territory "are no more bound by an act of Congress than we would be bound by an edict of the first consul of France." This led President Thomas Jefferson to remove him from office as territorial governor. He thus played no part in the organizing of the state of Ohio in 1803.

The first Ohio Constitution provided for a weak governor and a strong legislature, in part as a reaction to St. Clair's method of governance.

Family life
St. Clair met Phoebe Bayard, a member of one of the most prominent families in Boston, and they were married in 1760. Miss Bayard's mother's maiden name was Bowdoin and she was the sister of James Bowdoin, colonial governor of Massachusetts.
His eldest daughter was Louisa St. Clair Robb, a mounted messenger and scout, and known as a beautiful huntress.

Like many of his Revolutionary era peers, St. Clair suffered from gout as noted in correspondence with John Adams.

Death
In retirement St. Clair lived with his daughter, Louisa St. Clair Robb, and her family on the ridge between Ligonier and Greensburg.

Arthur St. Clair died in poverty in Greensburg, Pennsylvania, on August 31, 1818, at the age of 81.  His remains are buried under a Masonic monument in St. Clair Park in downtown Greensburg. St. Clair had been a petitioner for a Charter for Nova Caesarea
Lodge #10 in Cincinnati, Ohio, in 1791. This Lodge exists today, as Nova Caesarea Harmony #2. His wife Phoebe died shortly after and is buried beside him.

Legacy

A portion of the Hermitage, St. Clair's home in Oak Grove, Pennsylvania (north of Ligonier), was later moved to Ligonier, Pennsylvania, where it is now preserved, along with St. Clair artifacts and memorabilia at the Fort Ligonier Museum.

An American Civil War steamer was named USS St. Clair.

Lydia Sigourney included a poem in his honor,  in her first poetry collection of 1815.

The site of Clair's inauguration as Governor of the Northwest Territory is now occupied by the National Start Westward Memorial of The United States, commemorating the settlement of the territory.

Places named in honor of Arthur St. Clair include:

In Pennsylvania:
 Upper St. Clair, Pennsylvania
 St. Clairsville, Pennsylvania
 St. Clair Schuylkill County, Pennsylvania
 St. Clair Township, Westmoreland County, Pennsylvania
 East St. Clair Township, Bedford County, Pennsylvania
 West St. Clair Township, Bedford County, Pennsylvania
 The St. Clair neighborhood in Pittsburgh, Pennsylvania
 St. Clair Hospital, Mt. Lebanon, Pennsylvania

In Ohio:
St. Clair Township in Butler County, Ohio
 St. Clair Township in Columbiana County, Ohio,
 St. Clairsville, Ohio
 St. Clair Avenue in Cleveland, Ohio
 St. Clair Street in Dayton, Ohio
 St. Clair Street in Toledo, Ohio
 Fort St. Clair in Eaton, Ohio
Other States:
 St. Clair County, Illinois
   St. Clair Street in Indianapolis, Indiana
 St. Clair County, Missouri
 St. Clair County, Alabama
 St. Clair Street in Frankfort, Kentucky, was named for the St. Clair by Gen. James Wilkinson, who laid out the town that became the state capital. The street's north end is at the Old Capitol, and near its south end is the Franklin County Court House; both were designed by Gideon Shryock.

In Scotland:
 The three-star St Clair Hotel in Sinclair St, Thurso, Caithness, is named after him.

References
Notes

Books
 Kopper, Kevin Patrick. "Arthur St. Clair and the Struggle For Power in the Old Northwest, 1763–1803" (Dissertation. Kent State University, 2005) online

External links

 Ohio Memory
 Ohio History Central
  The Hermitage – home of Arthur St. Clair

1737 births
1818 deaths
Adjutants general of the United States Army
Continental Army generals
Continental Army officers from Pennsylvania
Continental Army personnel who were court-martialed
Continental Congressmen from Pennsylvania
18th-century American politicians
19th-century American politicians
Governors of Northwest Territory
Politicians from Cincinnati
People from Westmoreland County, Pennsylvania
American people of the Northwest Indian War
Alumni of the University of Edinburgh
British military personnel of the French and Indian War
People from Thurso
Royal American Regiment officers
British emigrants to the Thirteen Colonies
Commanding Generals of the United States Army